Shri Phanishwar Nath Renu Engineering College formerly known as Government Engineering College, Araria is a government engineering college in Araria district of Bihar. It was established in the year 2019 under Department of Science and Technology, Bihar and was named after writer Phanishwar Nath Renu. It is affiliated with Aryabhatta Knowledge University and approved by All India Council for Technical Education.

Admission 
Admission in the college for four years Bachelor of Technology course is made through UGEAC conducted by Bihar Combined Entrance Competitive Examination Board. To apply for UGEAC, appearing in JEE Main of that admission year is required along with other eligibility criteria.

Departments 

The college has three branches in Bachelor of Technology.

References

External links 
 

Engineering colleges in Bihar
Colleges affiliated to Aryabhatta Knowledge University
2019 establishments in Bihar
Educational institutions established in 2019